Streptomyces yaanensis is a bacterium species from the genus of Streptomyces which has been isolated from soil in Yaan in the Sichuan Province in China.

See also 
 List of Streptomyces species

References

Further reading

External links
Type strain of Streptomyces yaanensis at BacDive – the Bacterial Diversity Metadatabase

yaanensis
Bacteria described in 2013